Ahmed Mohamed El-Bashir Bakhit (born 27 August 1950) is a Sudanese footballer. He competed in the men's tournament at the 1972 Summer Olympics.

References

External links
 
 

1950 births
Living people
Sudanese footballers
Sudan international footballers
Olympic footballers of Sudan
Footballers at the 1972 Summer Olympics
1970 African Cup of Nations players
Africa Cup of Nations-winning players
Place of birth missing (living people)
Association football midfielders